The Mekons Rock 'n Roll is the eighth studio album by English rock band The Mekons, released in 1989.

Critical reception

The Mekons Rock 'n Roll was well received by critics on its initial release. It was voted the eighth best album of 1989 in The Village Voices Pazz & Jop critics' poll. In 1991, New York Times critic Jon Pareles called it "one of the best albums of the 1980s".

Decades later, critics still remembered it fondly. Pitchfork placed The Mekons Rock 'n Roll at number 97 on its 2002 list of the 100 best albums of the 1980s. In 2007, the record was ranked at number 97 on Blenders list of "The 100 Greatest Indie-Rock Albums Ever". It was included in Tom Moon's 2008 book 1,000 Recordings to Hear Before You Die.

Track listing
All songs composed by The Mekons (as per label).  The BMI database lists all songs as composed by Tom Greenhalgh and Jon Langford.

 "Memphis, Egypt"  – 3:37
 "Club Mekon"  – 3:29
 "Only Darkness Has the Power"  – 3:28
 "Ring O' Roses"  – 4:07
 "Learning to Live on Your Own"  – 4:37
 "Cocaine Lil"  – 2:51
 "Empire of the Senseless"  – 4:35
 "Someone"  – 2:44
 "Amnesia"  – 4:31
 "I Am Crazy"  – 3:28
 "Heaven and Back"  – 3:16
 "Blow Your Tuneless Trumpet"  – 3:56
 "Echo"  – 4:33
 "When Darkness Falls"  – 3:53

The American issue of this album omits "Ring O' Roses" and "Heaven and Back".

References

External links
Robert Christgau's liner notes for the 2001 Collector's Choice reissue
Lyrics and other information on the discography section of the official Mekons website

The Mekons albums
1989 albums
Blast First albums
A&M Records albums
Rough Trade Records albums